Kumar Gaurav (born Manoj Tuli; 11 July 1956) is an Indian businessman and former actor who worked in Hindi cinema. Son of actor Rajendra Kumar, Gaurav has appeared in several films such as Love Story, Teri Kasam, Star, Naam and Kaante.

Early and personal life
Kumar Gaurav was born as Manoj Tuli. He is a son of actor Rajendra Kumar and Shukla (from Behl family of Hindi films). In 1984 after 2 years of dating, he married Namrata Dutt (1962) who is a sister of Sanjay Dutt and daughter of Sunil Dutt and actress Nargis. They have two daughters, Saachi Kumar who is married to producer Kamal Amrohi's grandson Bilal Amrohi and Siya Kumar who is married to Aditya.

Brothers of Kumar's mother Shukla, are director Ramesh Behl and director Shyam Behl. His cousins are Shayms's children actor Ravi Behl and actress Geeta Behl as well as Ramesh's son Goldie Behl.

Career
He made his film debut opposite fellow debutante actress Vijayta Pandit with Love Story (1981) which was produced by his father who also starred alongside him in the film. This film played at the box office for a long period of time; not only for its innovative story, but also its memorable music by Rahul Dev Burman and the fresh leading debutants. Many youngsters began to emulate his character in the film, directed by Rahul Rawail. His next film, the 1982 release Teri Kasam with actress Poonam Dhillon was an average grosser. That same year he starred in the musical Star which failed to do well but its music was popular.

In 1985, he starred in Mahesh Bhatt's television film Janam. His understated performance in this film is still considered his career's best. In the following year he had his second box office hit with Naam (1986), again a Mahesh Bhatt film which was produced by his father and also starred his brother-in-law Sanjay Dutt in the lead role. Despite the success of Naam, Gaurav's career declined as all of his subsequent films failed to do well at the box office.

Having produced his earlier films Janam and Naam, his father tried to revive his career with the 1993 film Phool which had him paired with actress Madhuri Dixit. The film also had his father and father-in-law Sunil Dutt in supporting roles.  He then took a long break from acting and only had two delayed films releasing in 1996. In 1999, he made appearances in a few television series.

In 2000, he was seen again on the big screen in the delayed release Gang which had been in production for nearly a decade due to director Mazhar Khan's ill health. In 2002, he played one of the six protagonists in the crime thriller Kaante, directed by Sanjay Gupta and a remake of the American cult hit Reservoir Dogs (1992). Kaante was the third-highest-grossing film of 2002. Kaante remains his last Bollywood film to date.

In 2004, he appeared in his first American film, Guiana 1838, directed by Rohit Jagessar. The film tells the story of Indians arriving in the British colony of British Guiana (present-day Guyana) as indentured laborers amidst the abolition of slavery during the nineteenth century.

In 2006, he starred in the silent film My Daddy Strongest which remains his last acting role to date. He now runs a construction company.

Filmography

Television

Sikandar (1999)
Chocolate (1999)
Jeena Isi Ka Naam Hai (Season 1) (2002) .

Dubbing roles

Live action films

See also
 List of Hindi film families

References

External links

Living people
Indian male television actors
Indian male film actors
Indian male voice actors
Male actors in Hindi cinema
20th-century Indian male actors
21st-century Indian male actors
Place of birth missing (living people)
1960 births